Great Britain participated in the 2010 Summer Youth Olympics, the inaugural Youth Olympic Games, held in Singapore.

The British squad consisted of 40 athletes competing in 16 sports: aquatics (diving and swimming), archery, athletics, badminton, boxing, canoeing, equestrian, fencing, gymnastics, modern pentathlon, rowing, sailing, table tennis, taekwondo, tennis, and triathlon.

On 13 July 2010, the British Olympic Association announced their YOG squad with many well known names, including Tom Daley who competed for Great Britain at the 2008 Summer Olympics in Beijing, China and also won a world championship gold in Rome. Another well known name was Oliver Golding who reached the semi-finals of The Championships, Wimbledon in the boys singles of 2010.

Individual medallists

Archery

Boys

Mixed Team

Athletics

Boys
Track and Road Events

Field Events

Girls
Track and Road Events

Field Events

Badminton

Girls

Boxing

Boys

Canoeing

Boys

Diving

Boys

Girls

Equestrian

Fencing

Group Stage

Knock-Out Stage

Gymnastics

Artistic Gymnastics

Boys

Girls

Trampoline

Modern pentathlon

Rowing

Sailing

Windsurfing

Swimming

Table tennis

Individual

Team

Taekwondo

Tennis

Singles

Doubles

Triathlon

Girls

Men's

Mixed
{| class="wikitable" border="1"
|-
!Athlete
!Event
!Total Times per Athlete  (Swim 250 m, Bike 7 km,  Run 1.7 km)
!Total Group Time
!Rank
|-
|
|Mixed Team Relay  Europe 4
| 21:1119:0822:0420:31
| 1:22:54.12
| 7
|}

TV coverage
The BBC will cover the youth olympic games with highlights on the red button updated at 8am and 3pm and the highlights will also be on the BBC iPlayer. CBBC programmes Newsround and Blue Peter'' will also be reporting from Singapore, while the BBC News and the BBC Sport websites will be covering all the big stories from each day.

See also

References

External links
Competitors List: Great Britain

Summer Youth Olympics
Nations at the 2010 Summer Youth Olympics
Great Britain at the Youth Olympics